The Wizard Product Review is a fortnightly magic review show started by World Magic Shop in May 2010. It featured guests such as magician Paul Daniels. The show brings in a weekly audience of around 10,000 viewers; mostly magicians.

Hosts 
The show was originally hosted by David Penn and Craig Petty until 2015 when Craig was replaced by Sean Heydon who continues to host the show to date.

References

Magic organizations
Works about magic (illusion)